Nõmme Kalju FC, commonly known as Nõmme Kalju, or simply as Kalju (Estonian: "rock" or "cliff"), is an Estonian professional football club, based in Nõmme, Tallinn, that competes in the Meistriliiga, the top flight of Estonian football. The club's home ground is Hiiu Stadium.

Founded in 1923 and re-established in 1997, the club has played in the Meistriliiga since the 2008 season and have never been relegated from the Estonian top division. Nõmme Kalju have won two Meistriliiga titles, one Estonian Cup and one Estonian Supercup.

History

Founding and re-establishment (1923–2007)
Nõmme Kalju football club was founded in 1923 as a division of the Kalju Sports Club by two professional wrestlers, Aleksander Šneider and Mart Liiv. From 1925 to 1927, Kalju took part in the Estonian Football Championship, finishing fourth in the 1925 season. The club's home ground was Hiiu Stadium in Nõmme and the club remained active until World War II.

The club was re-established in 1997 by the former Estonia national team manager Uno Piir, Anton Siht and Värner Lootsmann. Nõmme Kalju joined the Estonian football league system and began competing in the Northern division of the III liiga. The club finished their first season in second place, while Joel Lindpere was the top goalscorer with 13 goals. Nõmme Kalju played in the III liiga for eight consecutive seasons.

In 2002, Kuno Tehva acquired the club with a goal of establishing a professional football club. Nõmme Kalju were promoted to the third tier II liiga in 2004 and to the second tier Esiliiga in 2005. Nõmme Kalju finished their first season in the Esiliiga in fifth place. In 2007, Getúlio Fredo was appointed as manager. Nõmme Kalju finished the 2007 season in sixth place and faced Kuressaare in the promotion play-offs. The club lost their first match home 0–1 but won the second leg away 2–1 and advanced to the Meistriliiga on away goals.

First league title (2008–2012)

In preparation for their Meistriliiga debut, Nõmme Kalju rebuilt the team by signing 16 new players. Nõmme Kalju finished their first season in the Meistriliiga in fourth place, only a point away from the third place, while Ingemar Teever won the top goalscorer's title with 23 goals. In 2009, the club also made its debut in Europe by playing in the 2009–10 UEFA Europa League, where they were defeated by Dinaburg 1–2 on aggregate in the first qualifying round. Nõmme Kalju finished the 2009 season in fifth place. In 2010, Igor Prins took over as manager and Nõmme Kalju finished the 2010 season in fourth place. The club strengthened their first-team squad significantly during the 2010–11 winter transfer window by signing Estonian internationals Alo Bärengrub, Tarmo Neemelo, Eino Puri and Kristen Viikmäe. Nõmme Kalju finished the 2011 season as runners-up, seven points behind champions Flora, while Tarmo Neemelo scored 22 goals. In the 2012 season, Nõmme Kalju won their first league title, amassing 92 points.

Recent history (2013–present)
By winning the Meistriliiga, Nõmme Kalju also qualified to the 2013–14 UEFA Champions League qualifying phase. Nõmme Kalju defeated HJK in the second qualifying round 2–1 on aggregate, but subsequently lost to Viktoria Plzeň 2–10 on aggregate in the third qualifying round. The team failed to defend their Meistriliiga title in the 2013 season, finishing as runners-up, despite Vladimir Voskoboinikov winning the goalscoring title with 23 goals. Nõmme Kalju finished the 2014 season with a disappointing fourth place, following which Igor Prins was sacked and replaced by former player Sergei Terehhov. Under Terehhov, the team had a successful start, winning first nine league games and winning their first Estonian Cup trophy, defeating Paide Linnameeskond 2–0 in the finals. In September 2015, Terehhov resigned after poor results in the Meistriliiga, with Getúlio Fredo taking over as caretaker manager. Nõmme Kalju finished the 2015 season in third place. In November 2015, it was confirmed that Sergei Frantsev would be hired as manager after the season. Under Frantsev, the team finished third in 2016 and 2017, before winning the Meistriliiga for the second time in 2018 without losing a single match. On 25 April 2019, Frantsev was sacked after a poor start to the 2019 season, with Roman Kozhukhovskyi taking over as caretaker manager, before being hired permanently on 14 June. In December 2019, Marko Kristal was appointed as manager. For the 2021 season, Sergei Frantsev returned to helm of the team, but was dismissed at the end of the year and replaced with Portuguese coach Eddie Cardoso. For the third consecutive year, Kalju finished the 2022 season in fourth place.

Crest and colours
The original club crest was most likely created in 1922, when the Kalju Sports Club was founded, although the author of crest remains unknown. The crest was remade by artist Martin Lazarev, who preserved all the historical elements, but gave the crest a finished shape and form.

Nõmme Kalju's uniforms have traditionally been black and white. In the 2000s, Nõmme Kalju also adopted the colour of pink, leading to the nickname Pink Panthers.

Stadium

Hiiu Stadium

Hiiu Stadium has been the historic home ground of Nõmme Kalju since 1923. It is a multi-purpose stadium currently owned by the Nõmme district and are operated by Nõmme Sports Centre. The stadium was completely renovated and re-opened in 2002, having an artificial turf. The stadium is located at Pidu 11, in Nõmme, Tallinn.

Kadriorg Stadium

From 2012 to 2014, and for home European matches, Nõmme Kalju played at the larger Kadriorg Stadium. Located in Kadriorg, the stadium was built from 1922 to 1926 and is one of the oldest football stadiums in Estonia. With a capacity of over 5,000, Kadriorg could seat 10 times as many spectators as the Hiiu Stadium.

Sportland Arena
From 2021, Kalju's unofficial home arena is Sportland Arena due to planned renovation at Hiiu. As of October 2022, it is unknown when the renovation would start.

Players

First-team squad

For season transfers, see transfers summer 2022 and transfers winter 2022–23.

Out on loan

Reserves and academy

Club officials

Coaching staff

Managerial history

Honours

League
 Meistriliiga
 Winners (2): 2012, 2018

Cups
 Estonian Cup
 Winners (1): 2014–15
 Estonian Supercup
 Winners (1): 2019

Kit manufacturers and shirt sponsors

Seasons and statistics

Seasons

Europe

References

External links

  
 Nõmme Kalju at Estonian Football Association

 
1923 establishments in Estonia
Association football clubs established in 1923
Association football clubs established in 1997
Football clubs in Tallinn
Meistriliiga clubs